Mitsubishi Sigma is a model name that was used by the Japanese automobile manufacturer Mitsubishi Motors between 1976 and 1996. Mitsubishi has utilized the "Sigma" name on several different vehicles based on Mitsubishi Galant and Mitsubishi Diamante sold in various markets during this time.

Mitsubishi Galant based

Japan (Galant Σ) 
Between 1976 and 1987 over three generations, the Mitsubishi Galant sedan sold in Japan was suffixed with the "Σ" (sigma) badge.

Australia 
Between 1980 and 1987 over two generations, the version of the Mitsubishi Galant sedan and station wagon produced and sold in Australia retailed under the Mitsubishi Sigma name. Between 1977 and 1980, prior to Mitsubishi taking over Chrysler Australia's operations, this model had been referred to as Chrysler Sigma.

New Zealand 
Between c. 1977 and c. 1988 over three generations, the version of the Mitsubishi Galant sedan and station wagon sold in New Zealand retailed under the Mitsubishi Sigma name.

North America 
The hardtop sedan bodywork of the Mitsubishi Galant (fifth generation) was sold in North America from 1987 for the 1988 model year as the Mitsubishi Galant Σ (sigma), and from 1988 to 1990 for the 1989 and 1990 model years as the Mitsubishi Sigma.

Mitsubishi Diamante based 
The regular sedan derivative of Mitsubishi Diamante hardtop sedan was sold in Japan as the Mitsubishi Sigma between 1991 and 1996. The sedan and station wagon models sold in Europe under the same Sigma name, and they also formed the basis of the Australian-made Mitsubishi Magna (second generation).

Sigma
Cars introduced in 1976